William Mark Nixon (31 May 1859 – 5 June 1931) was an Australian architect active at the end of the 19th century and the first quarter of the 20th century. His work encompassed the styles of the Federation Bungalow in domestic design and Federation Free Classical in civic and commercial design. He was active in local government and was President of Hornsby Shire and an Alderman in the Municipality of Ashfield.

Early life
Nixon was the son of Jane (née Graham) and William Nixon and was born in Sydney circa 1860. His father had emigrated from Hawick in Scotland with £30,000 from the sale of his family’s woollen mills. On arrival in Australia this money was largely lost on poor gold mining investments. He began his working life with the New South Wales Colonial Architect’s Office under James Barnet and in 1884 commenced as a draughtsman for the New South Wales Government Railways. In 1886 Nixon married Ada Fox, the daughter of a Church of England clergyman from Tumut, New South Wales.

Architectural practice
In 1893, with four young sons, he started his own architectural practice in Pitt Street, Sydney, with only £30 of savings. 

Architectural commissions included additions to St Andrew's College, University of Sydney and a new residence for its Principal, the remodelling of St George's Hall, Newtown, St Clement's Anglican Church, Mosman, Presbyterian churches at Singleton and Newcastle, hospitals, schools, stores. Amongst the houses he designed were Highbury, Centennial Park. Nixon practised in partnership with his son, Charles Ashwin Nixon, from 1910 until his death on active service in World War I. Then he  worked alone until his own retirement in 1930.

Local Government
Nixon served as a Hornsby Shire Councillor from 1908 until 1922 and was Shire President from 1910 until 1913.

References

1859 births
1931 deaths
Architects from Sydney
New South Wales architects
Federation architects
Shire Presidents and Mayors of Hornsby